Travis VanderZanden (born 1979)  is an American businessman and the founder and current CEO of Bird, a scooter sharing service. Before founding Bird, VanderZanden was Chief Operating Officer at Lyft, then VP of International Growth at Uber.

Education 
VanderZanden graduated from Appleton North High School in 1997, he later attended University of Wisconsin–Eau Claire from 1997 to 2002, receiving a Bachelor of Business Administration. He earned a Master of Business Administration from the USC Marshall School of Business in 2007.

Career

Early career 
VanderZanden worked as a product manager at Qualcomm. After leaving Qualcomm, he was Chief Revenue Officer for Yammer from 2009 to 2011, then left to co-found Cherry, an on-demand car-wash service. He was CEO of Cherry until 2013, when the company was acquired by Lyft, and he was brought on as Chief Operating Officer. He left Lyft for Uber in October 2014. Lyft later sued him for allegedly breaking his confidentiality agreement, and the lawsuit was settled for undisclosed terms, with VanderZanden denying any wrongdoing. VanderZanden then left Uber in October 2016.

Bird 
VanderZanden founded Bird in the summer of 2017. The company deployed its first scooters that September, before raising a $15 million Series A round of financing in February, 2018. In October of 2018, Bird released its latest edition of the scooter, Bird Zero, which was designed and built in partnership with Okai. As of 2019, the company is now in 120 cities across the globe. The company is valued at $2 billion and has taken in $415 million in funding. To date, Bird has provided more than 10 million rides. The company currently receives $1.27 on every Bird ride taken, which is inclusive of all costs. VanderZanden was a speaker at TechCrunch's Disrupt SF in October 2019.

During the COVID-19 mass layoff of Bird employees, VanderZanden was criticized for not informing employees in person about their dismissal, rather, delegating the task to the company's Chief Communications Officer.

Personal life 
In 2020, VanderZanden purchased a home in Bel Air formerly owned by Trevor Noah.

References

External links 
 

Living people
Marshall School of Business alumni
University of Wisconsin–Eau Claire alumni
21st-century American businesspeople
American technology chief executives
American technology company founders
American transportation businesspeople
Businesspeople from the San Francisco Bay Area
1979 births
People from Appleton, Wisconsin